Léon Devos (1897–1974) was a Belgian painter. He studied in Mons and at the Académie Royale des Beaux-Arts in Brussels.

In 1928, Devos, Anto-Carte, Léon Navez, and Frans Depooter became co-founders of the Groupe Nervia.

References

1897 births
1974 deaths
20th-century Belgian painters